The Registered Teacher Programme (RTP) is a programme in England and Wales for non-graduates to complete a degree, and gain qualified teacher status.  The programme is designed for people that have completed two years of higher education, and have gained a qualification such as a Higher National Diploma or Foundation degree.

To be on the Registered Teacher Programme, a person is required to work in a school as an unqualified teacher, usually for two years.  The minimum wage for a person on the programme is £15,461, with the school getting a grant of £9,100 from the Training and Development Agency for Schools to help towards the cost of employment.

See also

Graduate Teacher Programme

References

External links
Registered Teacher Programme – TDA website

Professional certification in teaching
Teaching in the United Kingdom